Rayanthur is a village in the Thanjavur taluk of Thanjavur district, Tamil Nadu, India.

Demographics 

As per the 2001 census, Rayanthur had a total population of 1857 with 914 males and 943 females. The sex ratio was 1032. The literacy rate was 77.49.

References 

 

Villages in Thanjavur district